Sawankhalok is a district (amphoe) in the northern part of Sukhothai province, in the lower north of Thailand.

Geography
Neighboring districts are (from the south clockwise) Si Samrong, Thung Saliam, Si Satchanalai, Si Nakhon of Sukhothai Province, Phichai of Uttaradit province and Phrom Phiram of Phitsanulok province.

History
The district was originally the capital district of Sawankhalok Province, which in 1932 was merged with Sukhothai Province. The new province was at first named Sawankhalok, but in 1939 was renamed Sukhothai and its capital district moved to Sukhothai district.

In 1917, the district was renamed from Mueang (เมือง) to Wang Mai Khon (วังไม้ขอน). In 1938 it was named Mueang Sawankhalok (เมืองสวรรคโลก), which was changed to Sawankhalok in 1939 following the provincial renaming.

In the 14th–16th centuries the area was a center of ceramics manufacture, Sangkhalok ceramic ware being its best-known example.

Economy
Subdistrict Ban Klong Krachong in Sawankhalok district is the largest producer of fresh banana leaves in Thailand. More than 50% of Sukhothai's 14,215 rai of banana plantations are in Ban Klong Krachong. The banana leaf industry generated about 179 million baht for the community in 2018. Banana leaves are used for wrapping foodstuffs and crafts such as fashioning krathong. Sawankholok farmers grow kluay tani bananas (Musa balbisiana). The fruit of this wild species of banana is not eaten as it is full of seeds. But the leaves of kluay tani (กล้วยตานี) are prized for their large size and toughness. In 2018, 40 local banana leaf farmers formed a group, Klum Kasettakon Plaeng Yai, to produce biodegradable banana leaf tableware: plates and bowls initially. Although the initiative is in its early stages, the group have already received orders from Thailand and abroad.

Administration
The district is divided into 14 sub-districts (tambons), which are further subdivided into 143 villages (mubans). Suwankhalok is a town (thesaban mueang) and covers tambon Mueang Suwankhalok. There are a further 13 tambon administrative organizations (TAO).

References

External links
amphoe.com (Thai)

Sawankhalok